A national postgraduate representative body exists in many countries and represents postgraduate students/researchers undertaking their doctorate (PhD) or postdoctoral research. Some have a broader remit to represent all postgraduates, including those taking master's degrees. A few countries have no specific body but are represented by a national body representing all students, including undergraduates.

In Europe, many of the national organisations have come together under the Eurodoc federation.

List of national postgraduate representative bodies by country

Specific postgraduate bodies

Armenia        – Ecosocium, Young Scientists NGO
Australia      - Council of Australian Postgraduate Associations 
Belgium        – Focus Research 
Bulgaria       – Asociacija na doktorantite v Bylgarija (ADB) 
Czech Republic – Czech Association of Doctoral Researchers (ČAD) 
Denmark        – Danske Ph.d.-stipendiaters netvaerk 
Estonia        – Eesti Noorte Teadlaste Akadeemia 
France         – Confédération des jeunes chercheurs (CJC) 
Germany        – Thesis 
Greece         – Elliniki Epistimoniki Etaireia Ypopsifion Didaktoron 
Hungary        – Doktoranduszok Országos Szövetsége (DOSZ) 
Italy          – Associazione Dottorandi e Dottori di Ricerca Italiani (ADI) 
Lithuania      – Lietuvos Jaunuju Mokslininku Sajunga 
Moldova        – ATCM Pro-Stiinta 
Netherlands      – Promovendi netwerk nederland (PNN) 
Norway         – Stipendiat-organisasjonene i Norge (SiN) 
Poland         – Sapere Aude 
Portugal       – Associação dos Bolseiros de Investigação Cientifica (ABIC) 
Romania        – Ad Astra 
Russia         – Young Researchers 
Slovakia       – Asociácia doktorandov Slovenska (ADS) 
Slovenia       – Drustvo Mladih Raziskovalcev Slovenije (DMRS) 
Spain          – Precarios 
Sweden         – Sveriges Doktorander (SDok) 
United Kingdom – National Postgraduate Committee (NPC) 
United States  - National Association of Graduate-Professional Students (NAGPS)

Represented by a body for all students

Austria - Austrian National Union of Students (Österreichische HochschülerInnenschaft - ÖH) 
Ireland - Union of Students in Ireland (USI)